Venugopal or Venu Gopal is one of the names of Krishna, based on Gopāla (literally "cow protector") as bearer of the flute Venu.

 Dr. S Venugopal, Director - Aeronautical Development Establishment (ADE), DRDO.
 Busa Venugopal is from Lachpet Kamareddy Telangana, South INDIA.
 D. Venugopal or Danapal Venugopal is a member of the 15th Lok Sabha of India from Tiruvannamalai Constituency. 
V. Venugopal is an Indian Film Editor. 
 K.C. Venugopal is an Indian politician and Union Minister of State for Power in Indian Government.
G. Venugopal is an Indian playback singer, known for his works in Malayalam film industry.
 Kottayan Katankot Venugopal or K. K. Venugopal is a senior advocate of Supreme Court of India and a constitutional lawyer.
 Madduri Venugopal better known as Master Venu was an Indian film music composer. 
 P. Venugopal is an Indian politician and incumbent member of the Parliament of India from Thiruvallur Constituency.
 Panangipalli Venugopal is an Indian Cardiovascular surgeon and hospital administrator.
 Rajani Venugopal is a former Test and One Day International cricketer.
 Vasanth Venugopal an Indian soldier. 
 Venugopal Chandrasekhar is a former National table tennis champion from Tamil Nadu. 
 Venugopal Dhoot is an Indian businessman. 
 Venugopal Sorab was a poet and writer in Kannada and in English. 
 Y. Venugopal Reddy or Yaga Venugopal Reddy better known as Y. V. Reddy, is an Indian administrator and Governor of the Reserve Bank of India.

  Venugopal Kalyanasundaram

See also
 Venugopal Rao (disambiguation)